Yordan Etov (born 10 February 1989) is a Bulgarian footballer who currently plays as a forward.

Career
Etov comes directly from Botev`s Youth Academy and still plays mainly for the youth team. On 2007 the Youth Academy forward Yordan Etov agreed the conditions of his first professional contract with the club which will be effective for three years. Etov made his official debut for Botev in a match against Vihren Sandanski on 24 November 2007. He played for 33 minutes. The result of the match was 1:0 with win for Botev.

External links
Player Profile at Plovdiv24
Guardian's Stats Centre

1989 births
Living people
Bulgarian footballers
Botev Plovdiv players
FC Chavdar Etropole players
Doxa Drama F.C. players
First Professional Football League (Bulgaria) players
Expatriate footballers in Greece
Association football forwards
Footballers from Plovdiv